Sandrine Ringler (born 10 September 1973) is a French football player who played as Defender for French club FC Vendenheim of the Division 1 Féminine.

International career

Sandrine Ringler represented France 19 times. Ringler was also part of the French team at the 1997 European Championships.

Coaching career

Since retiring from profesional football Ringler has become the  coach of the France women's national under-19 football team.

References

1973 births
Living people
People from Sélestat
French women's footballers
France women's international footballers
Women's association football defenders
Division 1 Féminine players
Women's association football managers
Female association football managers